The 2022 Nicholls Colonels football team represented Nicholls State University as a member of the Southland Conference during the 2022 NCAA Division I FCS football season. Led by eighth-year head coach Tim Rebowe, the Colonels compiled an overall record of 3–8 with a mark of 3–3 in conference play, tying for fourth place in the Southland. Nicholls played home games at Manning Field at John L. Guidry Stadium in Thibodaux, Louisiana.

Preseason

Preseason poll
The Southland Conference released their preseason poll on July 20, 2022. The Colonels were picked to finish third in the conference.

Preseason All–Southland Teams
The Southland Conference announced the 2022 preseason all-conference football team selections on July 13, 2022. Nicholls had a total of 10 players selected. 

Offense

1st Team
Collin Guggenheim – Running Back, SO
Lee NeGrotto – Tight End/Halfback, SO
K.J. Franklin – Wide Receiver, JR
Evan Roussel – Offensive Lineman, SO
Gavin Lasseigne – Placekicker, JR

2nd Team
Kohen Granier – Quarterback, SR
Mark Barthelemy – Offensive Lineman, SR

Defense

1st Team
Perry Ganci – Defensive Lineman, JR

2nd Team
Hayden Shaheen – Linebacker, SO
Jordan Jackson – Defensive Back, JR

Personnel

Schedule
Nicholls finalized their 2022 schedule on March 3, 2022.

‡The game vs. Incarnate Word was previously scheduled as a non-conference game, and was retained as such, even though both schools are still in the Southland Conference.

Game summaries

at South Alabama

at Louisiana-Monroe

at Southeast Missouri State

Jacksonville State

at Northwestern State

at HCU

No. 8т Incarnate Word

McNeese

at Lamar

Statistics

Texas A&M-Commerce

No. 23 Southeastern Louisiana

References

Nicholls Colonels
Nicholls Colonels football seasons
Nicholls Colonels